Johanna Friederike "Frieke" Buys (later Waterloo, born 7 June 1954) is a retired butterfly swimmer from the Netherlands, who represented her native country at the 1972 Summer Olympics. There she was eliminated in the semifinals of the 100 m butterfly, and in the heats of the 200 m butterfly. With the 4 × 100 m medley relay team she ended up in fifth place, clocking 4:29.99.

At the European championships, Buys placed fourth with the 4 × 100 m medley relay team in 1970.

References

1954 births
Living people
Dutch female butterfly swimmers
Swimmers at the 1972 Summer Olympics
Olympic swimmers of the Netherlands
People from Vlaardingen
Sportspeople from South Holland
20th-century Dutch women